The Lucky Ones is the ninth studio album by American a cappella pop group Pentatonix. It was originally released on 12 February 2021, through RCA Records, and a deluxe version of the album followed on 10 September 2021.

Background and composition 
The Lucky Ones is the group's second album containing all original material, following their 2015 self-titled album. During that period, three of the band's members embarked on solo careers, with Kirstin Maldonado releasing her 2017 extended play L.O.V.E. and Scott Hoying and Mitch Grassi forming the duo Superfruit, releasing their 2017 album Future Friends.

The bulk of the album was composed with and produced by Matthew Koma, best known for his work with Zedd and Carly Rae Jepsen, and his working affiliate Dan Book.

Track listing

Charts

References 

2021 albums
RCA Records albums
Pentatonix albums